Clyde, formerly Dunstan, is a small town in Central Otago, New Zealand with a population of  in  It is located on the Clutha River, between Cromwell and Alexandra.

Clyde grew up around the former settlement of Dunstan during the Central Otago goldrush of the 1860s. The town could once claim to be the most populous in New Zealand during the height of gold fever. The town's post office (and thus the town) was officially renamed from Dunstan to Clyde on 22 May 1865, after Lord Clyde.

St Dunstan's Church a now heritage building designed by the architect Francis William Petre in the early English Gothic revival style was built in Clyde in 1903.

More recently the town has been known for the Clyde Dam, a giant hydroelectric dam at the north end of the town, behind which lies Lake Dunstan. The Clutha River is the swiftest river (per volume) in the southern hemisphere. The river then runs to the Roxburgh Dam before finally meeting the sea at Balclutha.

The town is a popular holiday spot. It lies at the western end of the Otago Central Rail Trail. The Otago Central Branch Railway originally terminated at Cromwell, but this section of the railway was closed in 1980, with the railway to Clyde used to bring materials for the dam project. The rail trail is nowadays often cycled and walked by visitors and locals alike.

The township is home to Dunstan Hospital, serving the surrounding district, including Alexandra and Cromwell. The hospital was rebuilt in 2006 with the original building remaining.

Clyde is fast becoming known as a tourist haven.  The location is particularly attractive to those visiting the region's many vineyards and orchards. The regional weather is particularly warm and dry during the summer months due to the rain shadow effect caused by the Southern Alps (given New Zealand's westerly winds).

During the week beginning 22 September, the Clyde/Alexandra district hosts a Blossom Festival. This event celebrates the beginning of spring which brings the blossoming of fruit trees in the area's orchards. Entertainment at the festival includes a parade with floats made by local businesses, fun park rides, and bands.

Demographics 

Clyde had a population of 1,161 at the 2018 New Zealand census, an increase of 162 people (16.2%) since the 2013 census, and an increase of 255 people (28.1%) since the 2006 census. There were 528 households. There were 594 males and 564 females, giving a sex ratio of 1.05 males per female. The median age was 55.6 years (compared with 37.4 years nationally), with 165 people (14.2%) aged under 15 years, 99 (8.5%) aged 15 to 29, 558 (48.1%) aged 30 to 64, and 342 (29.5%) aged 65 or older.

Ethnicities were 93.8% European/Pākehā, 6.2% Māori, 1.8% Pacific peoples, 2.3% Asian, and 2.1% other ethnicities (totals add to more than 100% since people could identify with multiple ethnicities).

The proportion of people born overseas was 11.6%, compared with 27.1% nationally.

Although some people objected to giving their religion, 53.2% had no religion, 37.5% were Christian, 0.3% were Buddhist and 1.3% had other religions.

Of those at least 15 years old, 153 (15.4%) people had a bachelor or higher degree, and 198 (19.9%) people had no formal qualifications. The median income was $31,000, compared with $31,800 nationally. 144 people (14.5%) earned over $70,000 compared to 17.2% nationally. The employment status of those at least 15 was that 477 (47.9%) people were employed full-time, 156 (15.7%) were part-time, and 21 (2.1%) were unemployed.

Education

The school opened in 1863.

The nearest high school is Dunstan High School, which is situated 10 km away in Alexandra.

The nearest university is Otago University 200 km away in Dunedin.

Notable people

Steffan Browning, former Green Party MP
Jason Hewett, All Black
Roy Scott, cricketer

References

External links

Clyde (official website)
Promote Dunstan (Promotions Group for the region)

Central Otago District
Clutha River
Populated places in Otago